G. M. Malliet is an American author of mystery novels and short stories. She is best known as the author of the award-winning Detective Chief Inspector St. Just mysteries and the Rev. Max Tudor mysteries. The first book in her US-based series, Augusta Hawke, appeared in 2022. 

Malliet's first books followed DCI St. Just on a series of cases, all of which involved writers of mystery novels and other genres. Her second series, the Max Tudor mysteries, takes place in the fictional English town of Nether Monkslip, and features a vicar who is a former MI5 agent. Her third series, the Augusta Hawke mysteries, takes place in Old Town Alexandria, Virginia, US, and features a crime writer turned sleuth and private eye.

Awards and honors
Her first novel, Death of a Cozy Writer, won the 2008 Agatha Award for Best First Novel, and her books Wicked Autumn, A Fatal Winter, Pagan Spring, and A Demon Summer have all been short-listed for the Agatha Best Novel award. She received a Malice Domestic Grant in 2003 to write Death of a Cozy Writer.

Malliet's books Death of a Cozy Writer and Death and the Lit Chick were both nominated for Anthony Awards. Death of a Cozy Writer was also nominated for the Macavity Award for Best First Mystery. Several of her short stories - published in anthologies, in Ellery Queen Mystery Magazine, and in The Strand - have been nominated for writing awards.

She is represented by Mark Gottlieb of Trident Media Group in New York City.

Books

Max Tudor Series
Wicked Autumn, St. Martin's Press, 2011
A Fatal Winter, St. Martin's Press, 2012 
Pagan Spring, St. Martin's Press, 2013
A Demon Summer, St. Martin's Press, 2014
The Haunted Season, St. Martin's Press, 2015
Devil's Breath, St. Martin's Press, 2017
In Prior's Wood, St. Martin's Press, 2018
The Washing Away of Wrongs, Little, Brown, 2023

St. Just Series
Death of a Cozy Writer, Midnight Ink, 2008
Death and the Lit Chick, Midnight Ink, 2009
Death at the Alma Mater, Midnight Ink, 2010
Death in Cornwall, Canongate/Severn House, 2021
Death in Print (working title), Canongate/Severn House, 2023

Augusta Hawke Series
Augusta Hawke, Canongate/Severn House, 2022
Invitation to a Killer, Canongate/Severn House, 2023

Standalone Suspense
Weycombe, Midnight Ink, 2017

References

Agatha Award winners
American mystery writers
American women novelists
Women mystery writers
21st-century American novelists
21st-century American women writers
Living people
Year of birth missing (living people)